In the Money is a 1933 American pre-Code comedy film directed by Frank Strayer from an original screenplay by Robert Ellis. Starring Richard "Skeets" Gallagher, Lois Wilson, and Warren Hymer, the film was produced and distributed by the common tandem duo of Poverty Row studios, Invincible Corp. and Chesterfield Motion Pictures. It premiered on November 7, 1933.

Cast list
 Richard "Skeets" Gallagher as Spunk Hobbs
 Lois Wilson as Mary "Lambie" Higginbottom
 Warren Hymer as "Gunboat" Bimms
 Sally Starr as Babs Higginbottom
 Arthur Hoyt as Professor Higginbottom
 Junior Coghlan as Dick Higginbottom
 Erin La Bissonier as Genie
 Harold Waldridge as Lionel
 Louise Beavers as Lily

References

External links
 
 
 

1933 films
1933 comedy films
American comedy films
Chesterfield Pictures films
Films directed by Frank R. Strayer
American black-and-white films
1930s American films
1930s English-language films
English-language comedy films